Mahgarita stevensi is a genus of adapiform primate that lived in North America during the late Eocene. Fossils of the genus were found in the Duchesnean Laredo and Devil's Graveyard Formations of Texas.

References

Bibliography 

 

Prehistoric strepsirrhines
Eocene primates
Prehistoric mammals of North America
†Mahgarita
Prehistoric primate genera
Paleontology in Texas
Fossil taxa described in 1976